Trolley Square is a partially enclosed shopping center located in Salt Lake City, Utah, United States. It is considered to be a trendy high-end center. The center is near downtown Salt Lake City and the UTA TRAX light-rail system.

History

Description
Trolley Square is composed of barns that were built in 1908 to house Salt Lake City's streetcars. The streetcar system was dismantled in 1945, and the barns were converted into a two-story shopping center in 1972. The center is noted for its unusual architecture consisting of winding hallways, brick and wooden floors, fountains, old-trees, and wrought-iron balconies. Prominent tenants include Weller Book Works, Pottery Barn, Cabin Fever (a popular card store), Williams Sonoma, Old Spaghetti Factory, The Desert Edge Brewery at the Pub, The Spectacle, and local boutiques. The mall historically was home to a four-screen cinema and an amusement arcade.

The Trolley Square water tower is a 97-foot water tower that is a prominent feature of the Salt Lake City skyline, and is able to be spotted from miles away at night. The tower originally held 50,000 gallons of water, and was used to supply the sprinkler system for the trolley barns. In 1972, it was converted into a landmark, and covered in red and blue neon lights. For many years, the tower was a weather beacon, giving the local weather forecast based on the colors of lights, with solid blue being fair weather, flashing blue being overcast, solid red being rain, and flashing red being snow. The Trolley Square water tower was renovated in fall 2014, after years of disuse. During the renovation, the neon lights were removed - and were subsequently replaced with LED light strips which allowed for a wider spectrum of color availability. While the tower coloration is seemingly no longer used to display the weather forecast, different colors are now used decoratively during different seasons, holidays, or events.  

Another prominent feature of Trolley Square is the sky bridge that connects the main building to a small parking lot located across the street. The bridge was made from a salvaged ore conveyor bridge formerly in use at the International Smelting and Refining Company facility in Tooele, Utah. The bridge goes over 600 South, and it features neon lights shaped in the form of a trolley.

2007 shooting
The Trolley Square shooting was a mass shooting that occurred on the evening of February 12, 2007 at the mall. A lone gunman, identified as Sulejman Talović, killed five bystanders and wounded four others before being shot dead by several members of the Salt Lake City Police Department. Authorities were not able to determine a motive.

Location Influence
Trolley Square is a prominent and well-known landmark in the Salt Lake City area. As such, many surrounding businesses and locales borrow or incorporate the name "trolley." For example, Trolley Corners is a small office building located on the block directly to the east of Trolley Square, as is a small collection of houses that have been converted into businesses - known as trolley cottages. The nearest UTA Trax station is named "Trolley station".

Major businesses

 Alice Lane Home Collection
 Ballet West Academy
 Cabin Fever
 Coffee Connection
 CorePower Yoga
 Cosset Bath and Body
 Desert Edge Pub and Brewery
 Alliance Theater
 Flight Boutique
 Google Fiber Space
 Himalayan Artswear
 Jensen Technical Services
 Lanny Barnard Gallery
 Millennium Dance Company
 Orangetheory Fitness
 Payne Anthony Creative Jewelers
 Pottery Barn
 Pottery Barn Kids
 Precious Eyebrow Designers
 Rodizio Grill
 Styld' Blow Dry Bar
 SPARK
 Tabula Rasa
 The Machine Age
 The Old Spaghetti Factory
 The Spectacle
 Trolley Square Barbers
 We Olive - The Olive Oil Experience & Wine Bar
 Weller Book Works
 Wells Fargo
 Whole Foods Market
 Williams Sonoma

Sale and development
Trolley Square is owned by SK Hart Management, who purchased it in May 2013.

References

External links

 
 The history of Trolley Square from the Salt Lake Tribune
 Information on historic water tower and weather beacon, operated by KSL
 ScanlanKemperBard's Trolley Square purchase press release

1972 establishments in Utah
Buildings and structures in Salt Lake City
Shopping malls established in 1972
Shopping malls in Utah
Tourist attractions in Salt Lake City